Thomas Parkinson ( born 10 December 1744, Oxford, died c. 1789) was a British portrait-painter. He became a student in the schools of the Royal Academy in 1772.

Works

Parkinson was known as a painter of theatrical figures and groups. He also practised regularly as a portrait-painter, and exhibited portraits at the Free Society of Artists in 1769 and 1770, and at the Royal Academy from 1773 to 1789. Some of these were engraved, including:

William Balmain (by Richard Earlom), 
William Woodfall (by Isaac Jehner), 
Jonathan Britain, forger (by John Raphael Smith), and others.

Among his theatrical groups were:
 
Mr. Weston in the character of Billy Button in the "Maid of Bath" (Incorporated Society of Artists, 1772); 
Mr. Shuter, with Mr. Quick and Mrs. Green, in a scene from "She stoops to conquer" (engraved by Robert Laurie, 1776); 
A Scene from Cymon (Royal Academy, 1773); 
A Scene from The Duenna (Royal Academy, 1774); 
Garrick led off the Stage by Time with Tragedy and Comedy (engraved by Robert Laurie, 1779).

A number of Parkinson's small theatrical portraits were engraved. Some of the original drawings for these went to the Burney collection of theatrical portraits in the print-room at the British Museum.

Notes

Attribution

1744 births
Year of death missing
18th-century British painters
British male painters
British portrait painters
Artists from Oxford